John Eddy may refer to:

John Eddy (sailor) (1915–1981), British sailor
John A. Eddy (1931–2009), American astronomer
Jonathan Eddy (c. 1726–1804), British-American soldier

See also
John Eddie (born 1959), American rock singer
John Eadie (1810–1876), Scottish theologian
John Eadie (cricketer) (1861–1923), English brewer and cricketer
John Edie (disambiguation)